Xiangyang Road is a metro station on Line 1 of the Hangzhou Metro in China. It was opened on 30 December 2020, together with the Phase 3 of Line 1. It is located in the Xiaoshan District of Hangzhou.

References 

Railway stations in Zhejiang
Railway stations in China opened in 2020
Hangzhou Metro stations